George Anthony Hudson (14 March 1937 – 28 December 2020) was an English professional footballer, born in Manchester, who played as a centre forward in the Football League.

When Hudson joined Coventry City in April 1961, the £21,000 fee was the club's record transfer.

After his football career, Hudson worked on the Daily Mirror printing press in Manchester.

Honours 
 Coventry City Hall of Fame

References

1937 births
2020 deaths
Footballers from Manchester
English footballers
Blackburn Rovers F.C. players
Accrington Stanley F.C. (1891) players
Peterborough United F.C. players
Coventry City F.C. players
Northampton Town F.C. players
Tranmere Rovers F.C. players
Altrincham F.C. players
English Football League players
Association football forwards